Texarkana may refer to:

Texarkana metropolitan area, a two-county region in Texas and Arkansas, United States, anchored by the following two cities:
Texarkana, Texas
Texarkana, Arkansas
Texarkana College, Texarkana, Texas, a community college
"Texarkana" (song), by R.E.M., featuring Mike Mills on lead vocals
Texarkana, a fictional city in A Canticle for Leibowitz, Walter Miller's post-apocalyptic novel